Paget John Stewart (16 April 1963 – 7 October 2015) was a Canadian biathlete who competed in the 1988 Winter Olympics. He committed suicide in 2015.

References

1963 births
2015 suicides
Canadian male biathletes
Olympic biathletes of Canada
Biathletes at the 1988 Winter Olympics
Sportspeople from Winnipeg
Suicides in Alberta